Gunnar Broberg (born 5 October 1944) is a Swedish sailor. He competed in the Dragon event at the 1968 Summer Olympics.

References

External links
 

1944 births
Living people
Swedish male sailors (sport)
Olympic sailors of Sweden
Sailors at the 1968 Summer Olympics – Dragon
Sportspeople from Gothenburg